Fairy Bay (Māori name: Te Oru Mamaku, "Bay of the Big Black Ferns") is  east of Mount Stanley, elevation , in Pelorus Sound / Te Hoiere, part of the Marlborough Sounds Maritime Park, at the top of the South Island, New Zealand. The origin of the name is thought to have been the fairy penguin. A neighbouring bay immediately to the south is called Penguin Bay.

On the northern side of Fairy Bay is a camp site popular with kayakers and the beginning of a foot track through native bush which leads to the jetty at Jacobs Bay via Dillon Bell, a small deep water haven for yachts and motor cruisers.

There are also two marine farms located on the northern side of Fairy Bay, contributors to the Marlborough region's green lipped mussel (Perna canaliculus) industry based in Havelock.

Fairy Bay has some 13 building sites, of which eight now contain dwellings. Due to its remote location, there is no connection to the national electricity grid; however, there is a 'landline' telephone connection via a radio link. Cellular phone coverage ranges from nil to marginal.

Bays of the Marlborough Region
Marlborough Sounds